was a city located in Fukuoka Prefecture, Japan. The city existed from April 1, 1954.

As of 2003, the city had an estimated population of 42,449 with a population density of 253.90 persons per km². The total area was 167.19 km².

On March 20, 2006, Amagi, along with the towns of Asakura and Haki (both from Asakura District), was merged to create the city of Asakura.

References

External links
 Asakura official website 

Dissolved municipalities of Fukuoka Prefecture
Populated places disestablished in 2006
Populated places established in 1954
1954 establishments in Japan
2006 disestablishments in Japan